Changshan (长衫) is a type of traditional Chinese dress.

Changshan may also refer to:

Places
 Mount Chang or Changshan (常山), a former name of Mount Heng (Shanxi)
 Changshan County (常山县), of Quzhou City, Zhejiang
 Changshan Islands (长山岛), island group in the Bohai Sea off the coast of Shandong, under the administration of Changdao County
 Changshan Commandery (常山郡), a historical commandery in China

Towns (as 常山镇)
Changshan, Huadian, Jilin , in Huadian City, Jilin

Towns (as 长山镇)
Changshan, Qian Gorlos County, in Qian Gorlos Mongol Autonomous County, Jilin
Changshan, Donggang, Liaoning, in Donggang City, Liaoning
Changshan, Changdao County, in Changdao County, Shandong
Changshan, Zouping County, in Zouping County, Shandong

Townships (as 长山乡)
Changshan Township, Gannan County, in Gannan County, Heilongjiang
Changshan Township, Suileng County, in Suileng County, Heilongjiang
Changshan Township, Wuchang, Heilongjiang, in Wuchang City, Heilongjiang
Changshan Township, Jinhua, in Wucheng District, Jinhua, Zhejiang

Other uses
Chángshān (常山), an herb used in Chinese traditional medicine

See also
Cheongsam, female Chinese dress